Kanakayevo (Qanaqay) is a rural locality (a village) in Isheyevsky Selsoviet, Ishimbaysky District, Bashkortostan, Russia. The population was 776 as of 2010. There are 8 streets.

Geography 
Kanakayevo is located 20 km northeast of Ishimbay (the district's administrative centre) by road. Akhmerovo is the nearest rural locality.

References 

Rural localities in Ishimbaysky District